The Open College of the Arts (OCA) is an open learning arts college, with a Head Office in Barnsley in South Yorkshire, England. Founded in 1987 by Michael Young, it is a registered charity and the distance learning partner of the University for the Creative Arts (UCA). As of the 2016/17 academic year, the full cost of a part-time degree with the Open College of the Arts is less than £10,000.

OCA was acquired by the Open University (OU) in 2022 and from 1 August 2023 OCA-taught students will be enrolling as OU students.

Courses
The OCA offers BA honours degrees in the following areas:

Creative Arts
Drawing
Fine Art
Garden Design
Interior Design
Music
Graphic Design
Illustration
Painting
Photography
Textiles
Creative Writing
Visual Communications

An award-winning MA in Fine Art was launched in 2011. The MA in Graphic Design was launched in 2021. Degrees are awarded by the University for the Creative Arts.

The OCA has an open-door academic policy for its level 1 courses. Each student is assigned one of the college's 115 specialist tutors, who are arts practitioners and have experience teaching in higher education.  The tutors' responsibilities are limited to marking and providing feedback on student assignments.

Courses offered by the OCA are frequently updated or rewritten and new courses are added from time to time. Recent introductions are graphic design, illustration, digital film production and visual culture and there are new courses in photography and printmaking, adding to existing courses in these areas. Students and tutors all work from home and there is a well attended programme of study visits.

Management
As a charity the OCA is overseen by a board of trustees.

References

External links

College Blog
University for Creative Arts

Art schools in England
Buildings and structures in Barnsley
Distance education institutions based in the United Kingdom
Education in Barnsley
Music schools in England
Charities based in South Yorkshire